Lorena is the self-titled debut album of the Spanish singer Lorena. It was released on 27 March 2007 in Spain, two months after winning fifth series of Spanish Operación Triunfo in 2006. It is an album of personal covers of greatest hits of international artists that also includes two new songs.

The album entered and peaked at number 4 of the Spanish Top 100 Albums. Two singles were released from the album: "Sin Medida" in March 2007 and "Otro Amor Vendrá" in July 2007. As of September 2007, the album has sold more than 40,000 copies.

Track listing
 "Land of a Thousand Dances" (Hummon/Brokop) (Wilson Pickett cover) – 2:56
 "Sin Medida" (Alejandro Abad) – 4:06
 "Man! I Feel Like a Woman!" (Robert Lange/Shania Twain) (Shania Twain cover) – 3:57
 "Angels" (Robbie Williams/Guy Cambres) (Robbie Williams cover) – 4:01
 "Música" (Manuel Ruiz "Queco") – 3:56
 "Otro Amor Vendrá" ("I Will Love Again") (Barry P./M.Taylor) (Lara Fabian cover) – 4:25
 "Bohemian Rhapsody" (Freddie Mercury) (Queen cover) – 2:15
 "Y Lloré" ("Cryin'") (Joe Perry, Taylor Rhodes, Steve Tyler) (Aerosmith cover) – 4:14
 "Mi Corazón Continuará" ("My Heart Will Go On") (James Horner/Wilbur Jennings) (Celine Dion cover) – 4:35
 "Still Loving You" (Klaus Meine/Rudolf Schenker) (Scorpions cover) – 4:24
 "Born to Be Alive" (Patrick Hernandez) (Patrick Hernandez cover) – 3:23
 "Miralá, Miraló" (Alejandra Guzmán) (Alejandra Guzmán cover) – 4:04

Personnel
Technical:
Manuel Ruiz "Queco" — record producer
Eduardo Ruiz — recording engineer
Antonio Algarrada — recording engineer, mixing engineer
Nicola Almagro — recording engineer
Roberto Maccagno — mixing engineer, mastering engineer
Andrea Maccagno — mixing assistant

Musical:
Lorena Gómez "Lorena" — lead vocals
Ludovico Vagnone — Spanish guitar, acoustic guitar, electric guitar
Antonio Ramos "Maca" — bass guitar
Enzo Filippone — drums
Tino Di Geraldo — bass guitar, drums
Araceli Lavado — background vocals
Carlos Lázaro — background vocals
Raúl Ruiz — keyboards, programming
Alberto Miras — keyboards, programming
Carlos Vera — keyboards, programming
Nicola Almagro — keyboards, programming

Chart performance

Singles
"Sin Medida" was the first single of the album, was released as the album in March 2007. The videoclip was released a month later, it was recorded in Lleida. The song is O.S.T. of the miniserie La Bella Otero.
"Otro Amor Vendrá" was the second single of the album, was released in the beginnings of July 2007. It is a cover of the 2000 hit "I Will Love Again" of Lara Fabian. There was not a videoclip released for this single.
"Miralá, Miraló" was the third single of the album, was released in November 2007. It is a cover of Alejandra Guzmán. There was not a videoclip released for this single.

Criticism
The album was not exempt of critics for choose to make a covers album as a debut. Lorena answered that record period was not too long (exactly 3 days of record for her voice), that was an original idea never done with a winner of Operación Triunfo, and that this songs were special for her and wanted to sing in an album.

References

External links
 Lorena's Official Site (in Spanish)
 Lorena's Fans Club (in Spanish)

Lorena (singer) albums
2007 debut albums